The NWA World Women's Championship is a women's professional wrestling world championship created and promoted by the American professional wrestling promotion National Wrestling Alliance (NWA). The title was first held by Mildred Burke in 1950, who was recognized as champion due her February 11, 1937 defeat of Women's World Champion Clara Mortensen. The championship is currently held by Kamille, who is in her first reign.

History 
Mildred Burke was recognized as the inaugural champion in 1950. After her Two out of three falls match against June Byers in 1954 ended in a no contest, Byers was recognized as the NWA World Women's Champion, and Burke created the WWWA World Championship and was recognized as its first champion. Upon June Byers's retirement, it was held primarily (and operated) by Lillian Ellison (under the ring name of The Fabulous Moolah), who first won the championship in a battle royal in September 1956.

In 1983, the physical belt was sold by Ellison to the World Wrestling Federation (WWF, now WWE), where it became the WWF Women's Championship. The World Wrestling Federation recognized Moolah as the reigning champion but did not recognize any of the title changes that had occurred since Moolah was first awarded the title in 1956. The NWA Women's title continued its lineage after Moolah's belt was purchased and renamed by the WWF.

The Fabulous Moolah has held the title more times than any other wrestler, with a total of four reigns. She also has the longest reign of 3,651 days, and is the oldest champion after winning the title at 55 years old. Malia Hosaka has the shortest reign at 1 day. La Reina de Corazones is the youngest champion after winning the title at 21 years of age. Overall, the title has been held by 25 different women for a total of 35 reigns.

Via various partnerships, the NWA World Women's Championship has also been defended in other promotions.

Reigns

Names

Combined reigns

See also 
 List of National Wrestling Alliance championships
 NWA World Women's Tag Team Championship
 WWE Women's Championship (1956-2010)
 AEW Women's World Championship
 Women's World Championship
 World Women's Championship (disambiguation)

Notes

References

External links 
 NWA World Women's Title History

National Wrestling Alliance championships
Jim Crockett Promotions championships
World professional wrestling championships
Women's professional wrestling championships